Greifswald University Hospital in Greifswald, Germany is a teaching hospital for the University of Greifswald's medical school. Greifswald University Hospital is owned and operated by a non-profit Anstalt des öffentlichen Rechts in cooperation with the university and serves as one of the primary hospitals in the state of Mecklenburg-Vorpommern. It also fills the function of a tertiary referral hospital for the health care region.

History 

The history of the medical school and the hospital in Greifswald date back to the founding of the University of Greifswald in the year 1456. An open clinic was established in 1794 with the help of the city council, where patients were treated for free with under the condition that students were present while the patient was being treated.

In the 19th century, many new buildings and facilities were built.

An entirely new hospital complex was built from 2001 to 2010 at a central campus location, thus replacing the former buildings that were scattered across the city.

Teaching

Facilities
Apart from Heart transplants, the hospital is a full-service hospital.

List of Clinical Departments 
Currently, the University Hospital consists of the following clinical departments.
 Clinic for general and visceral  surgery, thoracic and vascular surgery
 Clinic for Anesthesiology
 Clinic for Ophthalmology
 Clinic for Obstetrics and gynecology
 Clinic for Otorhinolaryngology and Head/Neck-Surgery
 Clinic for Dermatology
 Clinic for Internal Medicine A (Gastroenterology, Nephrology, Rheumatology, Endocrinology, Nutritional Medicine and Emergency Medicine)
 Clinic for Internal Medicine B (Pneumology, Cardiology, Angiology, Internal Intensive Medicine)
 Clinic for Internal Medicine C (Hematology, Oncology)
 Clinic for paediatric surgery
 Clinic for paediatrics
 Clinic for neurosurgery
 Clinic for Neurology
 Clinic for Nuclear medicine
 Clinic for Orthopaedics
 Clinic for Psychiatry and Psychotherapy
 Clinic for Radiology
 Clinic for Radiation therapy
 Clinic for Urology
 Centre of Orthopaedics, trauma surgery and rehabilitative medicine
 Centre of Dentistry

List of Institutes and Research Centres 
Complementing the clinics there are a number of institutes.
 Institute for Anatomy and Cell biology
 Institute for Bioinformatics
 Institute for Community Medicine
 Dept. of Methods in community medicine
 Dept. of epidemiology in care and Community Health
 Dept. for the Study of Health in Pomerania (SHIP) and clinical epidemiology
 Dept. of general practice
 Institute for Ethics and Medical History
 Institute for Genetics and functional Genomics
 Dept. of functional Genomics
 Dept. of human genetics
 Institute for Hygiene and environmental medicine
 Institute for Immunology
 Institute for Transfusion Medicine
 Institute for clinical chemistry and laboratory medicine
 Institute for medical biochemistry and molecular biology
 Institute for medical microbiology
 Institute for medical psychology
 Institute for Pathology
 Institute for Pathophysiology
 Institute for Pharmacology
 Institute for Physiology
 Institute for forensic medicine
 Institute for social medicine and prevention

Notable people

 Theodor Billroth, surgeon
 Heinrich Adolf von Bardeleben
 Friedrich Loeffler, bacteriologist (namesake of the Friedrich Loeffler Institute)
 Gustav Nachtigal, explorer of Africa
 Ludwik Rydygier, surgeon
 Ferdinand Sauerbruch, surgeon
 Carl Ludwig Schleich, surgeon and writer

References

External links 

 Official website of the hospital and medical school (see also: University of Greifswald Faculty of Medicine)
 University of Greifswald (see also: University of Greifswald)
 photo of the new building

Greifswald
Hospital buildings completed in 2010
Hospital
Greifswald
Hospitals established in the 15th century
Companies based in Mecklenburg-Western Pomerania
Medical and health organisations based in Mecklenburg-Western Pomerania